A pension (from Latin pensiō, "payment") is a fund into which a sum of money is added during an employee's employment years and from which payments are drawn to support the person's retirement from work in the form of periodic payments. A pension may be a "defined benefit plan", where a fixed sum is paid regularly to a person, or a "defined contribution plan", under which a fixed sum is invested that then becomes available at retirement age. Pensions should not be confused with severance pay; the former is usually paid in regular amounts for life after retirement, while the latter is typically paid as a fixed amount after involuntary termination of employment before retirement.

The terms "retirement plan" and "superannuation" tend to refer to a pension granted upon retirement of the individual. Retirement plans may be set up by employers, insurance companies, the government, or other institutions such as employer associations or trade unions. Called retirement plans in the United States, they are commonly known as pension schemes in the United Kingdom and Ireland and superannuation plans (or super) in Australia and New Zealand. Retirement pensions are typically in the form of a guaranteed life annuity, thus insuring against the risk of longevity.

A pension created by an employer for the benefit of an employee is commonly referred to as an occupational or employer pension. Labor unions, the government, or other organizations may also fund pensions. Occupational pensions are a form of deferred compensation, usually advantageous to employee and employer for tax reasons. Many pensions also contain an additional insurance aspect, since they often will pay benefits to survivors or disabled beneficiaries. Other vehicles (certain lottery payouts, for example, or an annuity) may provide a similar stream of payments.

The common use of the term pension is to describe the payments a person receives upon retirement, usually under pre-determined legal or contractual terms. A recipient of a retirement pension is known as a pensioner or retiree.

Types

Employment-based pensions
A retirement plan is an arrangement to provide people with an income during retirement when they are no longer earning a steady income from employment. Often retirement plans require both the employer and employee to contribute money to a fund during their employment in order to receive defined benefits upon retirement.  It is a tax deferred savings vehicle that allows for the tax-free accumulation of a fund for later use as retirement income.  Funding can be provided in other ways, such as from labor unions, government agencies, or self-funded schemes. Pension plans are therefore a form of "deferred compensation". A SSAS is a type of employment-based Pension in the UK. The 401(k) is the iconic self-funded retirement plan that many Americans rely on for much of their retirement income; these sometimes include money from an employer, but are usually mostly or entirely funded by the individual using an elaborate scheme where money from the employee's paycheck is withheld, at their direction, to be contributed by their employer to the employee's plan. This money can be tax-deferred or not, depending on the exact nature of the plan.

Some countries also grant pensions to military veterans. Military pensions are overseen by the government; an example of a standing agency is the United States Department of Veterans Affairs. Ad hoc committees may also be formed to investigate specific tasks, such as the U.S. Commission on Veterans' Pensions (commonly known as the "Bradley Commission") in 1955–56.  Pensions may extend past the death of the veteran himself, continuing to be paid to the widow.

Social and state pensions
Many countries have created funds for their citizens and residents to provide income when they retire (or in some cases become disabled). Typically this requires payments throughout the citizen's working life in order to qualify for benefits later on. A basic state pension is a "contribution based" benefit, and depends on an individual's contribution history. For examples, see National Insurance in the UK, or Social Security in the United States of America.

Many countries have also put in place a "social pension". These are regular, tax-funded non-contributory cash transfers paid to older people. Over 80 countries have social pensions. Some are universal benefits, given to all older people regardless of income, assets or employment record. Examples of universal pensions include New Zealand Superannuation and the Basic Retirement Pension of Mauritius. Most social pensions, though, are means-tested, such as Supplemental Security Income in the United States of America or the "older person's grant" in South Africa.

Disability pensions

Some pension plans will provide for members in the event they suffer a disability.  This may take the form of early entry into a retirement plan for a disabled member below the normal retirement age.

Benefits
Retirement plans may be classified as defined benefit, defined contribution or defined ambition / target benefit according to how the benefits are determined. A defined benefit plan guarantees a certain payout at retirement, according to a fixed formula which usually depends on the member's salary and the number of years' membership in the plan.  A defined contribution plan will provide a payout at retirement that is dependent upon the amount of money contributed and the performance of the investment vehicles utilized. Hence, with a defined contribution plan the risk and responsibility lies with the employee that the funding will be sufficient through retirement, whereas with the defined benefit plan the risk and responsibility lies with the employer or plan managers.

Some types of retirement plans, such as cash balance plans, combine features of both defined benefit and defined contribution plans.  They are often referred to as hybrid plans. Such plan designs have become increasingly popular in the US since the 1990s.  Examples include Cash Balance and Pension Equity plans.

Defined benefit plans

A Defined Benefit (DB) pension plan is a plan in which workers accrue pension rights during their time at a firm and upon retirement the firm pays them a benefit that is a function of that worker's tenure at the firm and of their earnings. In other words, a DB plan is a plan in which the benefit on retirement is determined by a set formula, rather than depending on investment returns. Government pensions such as Social Security in the United States are a type of defined benefit pension plan. Traditionally, defined benefit plans for employers have been administered by institutions which exist specifically for that purpose, by large businesses, or, for government workers, by the government itself. A traditional form of defined benefit plan is the final salary plan, under which the pension paid is equal to the number of years worked, multiplied by the member's salary at retirement, multiplied by a factor known as the accrual rate. The final accrued amount is available as a monthly pension or a lump sum, but usually monthly.

The benefit in a defined benefit pension plan is determined by a formula that can incorporate the employee's pay, years of employment, age at retirement, and other factors. A simple example is a Dollars Times Service plan design that provides a certain amount per month based on the time an employee works for a company. For example, a plan offering $100 a month per year of service would provide $3,000 per month to a retiree with 30 years of service. While this type of plan is popular among unionized workers, Final Average Pay (FAP) remains the most common type of defined benefit plan offered in the United States. In FAP plans, the average salary over the final years of an employee's career determines the benefit amount.

Averaging salary over a number of years means that the calculation is averaging different dollars. For example, if salary is averaged over five years, and retirement is in 2006, then salary in 2001 dollars is averaged with salary in 2002 dollars, etc., with 2001 dollars being worth more than the dollars of succeeding years. The pension is then paid in first year of retirement dollars, in this example 2006 dollars, with the lowest value of any dollars in the calculation. Thus inflation in the salary averaging years has a considerable impact on purchasing power and cost, both being reduced equally by inflation.

This effect of inflation can be eliminated by converting salaries in the averaging years to first year of retirement dollars, and then averaging.

In the US,  specifies a defined benefit plan to be any pension plan that is not a defined contribution plan (see below) where a defined contribution plan is any plan with individual accounts. A traditional pension plan that defines a benefit for an employee upon that employee's retirement is a defined benefit plan.  In the U.S., corporate defined benefit plans, along with many other types of defined benefit plans, are governed by the Employee Retirement Income Security Act of 1974 (ERISA).

In the United Kingdom, benefits are typically indexed for inflation (known as Retail Prices Index (RPI)) as required by law for registered pension plans. Inflation during an employee's retirement affects the purchasing power of the pension; the higher the inflation rate, the lower the purchasing power of a fixed annual pension. This effect can be mitigated by providing annual increases to the pension at the rate of inflation (usually capped, for instance at 5% in any given year). This method is advantageous for the employee since it stabilizes the purchasing power of pensions to some extent.

If the pension plan allows for early retirement, payments are often reduced to recognize that the retirees will receive the payouts for longer periods of time. In the United States, under the Employee Retirement Income Security Act of 1974, any reduction factor less than or equal to the actuarial early retirement reduction factor is acceptable.

Many DB plans include early retirement provisions to encourage employees to retire early, before the attainment of normal retirement age (usually age 65). Companies would rather hire younger employees at lower wages. Some of those provisions come in the form of additional temporary or supplemental benefits, which are payable to a certain age, usually before attaining normal retirement age.

Due to changes in pensions over the years, many pension systems, including those in Alabama, California, Indiana, and New York, have shifted to a tiered system. For a simplified example, suppose there are three employees that pay into a state pension system: Sam, Veronica, and Jessica. The state pension system has three tiers: Tier I, Tier II, and Tier III. These three tiers are based on the employee's hire date (i.e. Tier I covers 1 January 1980 (and before) to 1 January 1995, Tier II 2 January 1995 to 1 January 2010, and Tier III 1 January 2010 to present) and have different benefit provisions (e.g. Tier I employees can retire at age 50 with 80% benefits or wait until 55 with full benefits, Tier II employees can retire at age 55 with 80% benefits or wait until 60 for full benefits, Tier III employees can retire at age 65 with full benefits). Therefore, Sam, hired in June 1983, would be subject to the provisions of the Tier I scheme, whereas Veronica, hired in August 1995, would be permitted to retire at age 60 with full benefits and Jessica, hired in December 2014, would not be able to retire with full benefits until she became 65.

DB funding

Defined benefit plans may be either funded or unfunded.

In an unfunded defined benefit pension, no assets are set aside and the benefits are paid for by the employer or other pension sponsor as and when they are paid. Pension arrangements provided by the state in most countries in the world are unfunded, with benefits paid directly from current workers' contributions and taxes.  This method of financing is known as pay-as-you-go, or PAYGO. The social security systems of many European countries are unfunded, having benefits paid directly out of current taxes and social security contributions, although several countries have hybrid systems which are partially funded. Spain set up the Social Security Reserve Fund and France set up the Pensions Reserve Fund; in Canada the wage-based retirement plan (CPP) is partially funded, with assets managed by the CPP Investment Board while the U.S. Social Security system is partially funded by investment in special U.S. Treasury Bonds.

In a funded plan, contributions from the employer, and sometimes also from plan members, are invested in a fund towards meeting the benefits.  All plans must be funded in some way, even if they are pay-as-you-go, so this type of plan is more accurately known as pre-funded or fully-funded.  The future returns on the investments, and the future benefits to be paid, are not known in advance, so there is no guarantee that a given level of contributions will be enough to meet the benefits.  Typically, the contributions to be paid are regularly reviewed in a valuation of the plan's assets and liabilities, carried out by an actuary to ensure that the pension fund will meet future payment obligations.  This means that in a defined benefit pension, investment risk and investment rewards are typically assumed by the sponsor/employer and not by the individual.  If a plan is not well-funded, the plan sponsor may not have the financial resources to continue funding the plan.

DB criticisms

Traditional defined benefit plan designs (because of their typically flat accrual rate and the decreasing time for interest discounting as people get closer to retirement age) tend to exhibit a J-shaped accrual pattern of benefits, where the present value of benefits grows quite slowly early in an employee's career and accelerates significantly in mid-career: in other words it costs more to fund the pension for older employees than for younger ones (an "age bias"). Defined benefit pensions tend to be less portable than defined contribution plans, even if the plan allows a lump sum cash benefit at termination. Most plans, however, pay their benefits as an annuity, so retirees do not bear the risk of low investment returns on contributions or of outliving their retirement income. The open-ended nature of these risks to the employer is the reason given by many employers for switching from defined benefit to defined contribution plans over recent years. The risks to the employer can sometimes be mitigated by discretionary elements in the benefit structure, for instance in the rate of increase granted on accrued pensions, both before and after retirement.

The age bias, reduced portability and open ended risk make defined benefit plans better suited to large employers with less mobile workforces, such as the public sector (which has open-ended support from taxpayers). This coupled with a lack of foresight on the employers part means a large proportion of the workforce are kept in the dark over future investment schemes.

Defined benefit plans are sometimes criticized as being paternalistic as they enable employers or plan trustees to make decisions about the type of benefits and family structures and lifestyles of their employees. However they are typically more valuable than defined contribution plans in most circumstances and for most employees (mainly because the employer tends to pay higher contributions than under defined contribution plans), so such criticism is rarely harsh.

The "cost" of a defined benefit plan is not easily calculated, and requires an actuary or actuarial software. However, even with the best of tools, the cost of a defined benefit plan will always be an estimate based on economic and financial assumptions. These assumptions include the average retirement age and lifespan of the employees, the returns to be earned by the pension plan's investments and any additional taxes or levies, such as those required by the Pension Benefit Guaranty Corporation in the U.S. So, for this arrangement, the benefit is relatively secure but the contribution is uncertain even when estimated by a professional.  This has serious cost considerations and risks for the employer offering a pension plan.

One of the growing concerns with defined benefit plans is that the level of future obligations will outpace the value of assets held by the plan.  This "underfunding" dilemma can be faced by any type of defined benefit plan, private or public, but it is most acute in governmental and other public plans where political pressures and less rigorous accounting standards can result in excessive commitments to employees and retirees, but inadequate contributions.  Many states and municipalities across the United States of America and Canada now face chronic pension crises.

DB examples
Many countries offer state-sponsored retirement benefits, beyond those provided by employers, which are funded by payroll or other taxes. In the United States, the Social Security system is similar in function to a defined benefit pension arrangement, albeit one that is constructed differently from a pension offered by a private employer; however, Social Security is distinct in that there is no legally guaranteed level of benefits derived from the amount paid into the program.

Individuals that have worked in the UK and have paid certain levels of national insurance deductions can expect an income from the state pension scheme after their normal retirement. The state pension is currently divided into two parts: the basic state pension, State Second [tier] Pension scheme called S2P. Individuals will qualify for the basic state pension if they have completed sufficient years contribution to their national insurance record.  The S2P pension scheme is earnings related and depends on earnings in each year as to how much an individual can expect to receive. It is possible for an individual to forgo the S2P payment from the state, in lieu of a payment made to an appropriate pension scheme of their choice, during their working life.  For more details see UK pension provision.

Defined contribution plans

A defined contribution (DC) plan, is a pension plan where employers set aside a certain proportion (i.e. contributions) of a worker's earnings (such as 5%) in an investment account, and the worker receives this savings and any accumulated investment earnings upon retirement. These contributions are paid into an individual account for each member. The contributions are invested, for example in the stock market, and the returns on the investment (which may be positive or negative) are credited to the individual's account.  On retirement, the member's account is used to provide retirement benefits, sometimes through the purchase of an annuity which then provides a regular income.  Defined contribution plans have become widespread all over the world in recent years, and are now the dominant form of plan in the private sector in many countries.  For example, the number of defined benefit plans in the US has been steadily declining, as more and more employers see pension contributions as a large expense avoidable by disbanding the defined benefit plan and instead offering a defined contribution plan.

Money contributed can either be from employee salary deferral or from employer contributions. The portability of defined contribution pensions is legally no different from the portability of defined benefit plans.  However, because of the cost of administration and ease of determining the plan sponsor's liability for defined contribution plans (you do not need to pay an actuary to calculate the lump sum equivalent that you do for defined benefit plans) in practice, defined contribution plans have become generally portable.

In a defined contribution plan, investment risk and investment rewards are assumed by each individual/employee/retiree and not by the sponsor/employer, and these risks may be substantial. In addition, participants do not necessarily purchase annuities with their savings upon retirement, and bear the risk of outliving their assets. (In the United Kingdom, for instance, it is a legal requirement to use the bulk of the fund to purchase an annuity.)

The "cost" of a defined contribution plan is readily calculated, but the benefit from a defined contribution plan depends upon the account balance at the time an employee is looking to use the assets.  So, for this arrangement, the contribution is known but the benefit is unknown (until calculated).

Despite the fact that the participant in a defined contribution plan typically has control over investment decisions, the plan sponsor retains a significant degree of fiduciary responsibility over investment of plan assets, including the selection of investment options and administrative providers.

A defined contribution plan typically involves a number of service providers, including in many cases:
 Trustee
 Custodian
 Administrator
 Recordkeeper
 Auditor
 Legal counsel
 Investment management company

DC examples
In the United States, the legal definition of a defined contribution plan is a plan providing for an individual account for each participant, and for benefits based solely on the amount contributed to the account, plus or minus income, gains, expenses and losses allocated to the account (see ). Examples of defined contribution plans in the United States include individual retirement accounts (IRAs) and 401(k) plans. In such plans, the employee is responsible, to one degree or another, for selecting the types of investments toward which the funds in the retirement plan are allocated.  This may range from choosing one of a small number of pre-determined mutual funds to selecting individual stocks or other securities.  Most self-directed retirement plans are characterized by certain tax advantages, and some provide for a portion of the employee's contributions to be matched by the employer.  In exchange, the funds in such plans may not be withdrawn by the investor prior to reaching a certain age—typically the year the employee reaches 59.5 years old (with a small number of exceptions)—without incurring a substantial penalty.

Advocates of defined contribution plans point out that each employee has the ability to tailor the investment portfolio to his or her individual needs and financial situation, including the choice of how much to contribute, if anything at all.  However, others state that these apparent advantages could also hinder some workers who might not possess the financial savvy to choose the correct investment vehicles or have the discipline to voluntarily contribute money to retirement accounts.

In the US, defined contribution plans are subject to IRS limits on how much can be contributed, known as the section 415 limit.  In 2009, the total deferral amount, including employee contribution plus employer contribution, was limited to $49,000 or 100% of compensation, whichever is less.  The employee-only limit in 2009 was $16,500 with a $5,500 catch-up. These numbers usually increase each year and are indexed to compensate for the effects of inflation.  For 2015, the limits were raised to $53,000 and $18,000, respectively.

Examples of defined contribution pension schemes in other countries are, the UK's personal pensions and proposed National Employment Savings Trust (NEST), Germany's Riester plans, Australia's Superannuation system and New Zealand's KiwiSaver scheme. Individual pension savings plans also exist in Austria, Czech Republic, Denmark, Greece, Finland, Ireland, Netherlands, Slovenia and Spain

Risk sharing pensions
Many developed economies are moving beyond DB & DC Plans and are adopting a new breed of collective risk sharing schemes where plan members pool their contributions and to a greater or less extent share the investment and longevity risk.

There are multiple naming conventions for these plans reflecting the fact that the future payouts are a target or ambition of the plan sponsor rather than a guarantee, common naming conventions include: 
 Defined Ambition Plans
 Target benefit plans
 Collective Defined Contribution Schemes
 Tontine Pensions (the original longevity risk sharing scheme invented in 1653).

Risk sharing pension sponsor examples
 Canada: Healthcare of Ontario Pension Plan (HOOPP)
 US: State of Wisconsin Investment Board
 US: TIAA
 APAC/Europe: Tontine Trust
 UK: Royal Mail Pension Fund 
 Netherlands: Stichting Pensioenfonds ABP
 Denmark: Arbejdsmarkedets Tillægspension

Other pension plan types

Hybrid and cash balance plans
Hybrid plan designs combine the features of defined benefit and defined contribution plan designs.

A cash balance plan is a defined benefit plan made to appear as if it were a defined contribution plan.  They have notional balances in hypothetical accounts where, typically, each year the plan administrator will contribute an amount equal to a certain percentage of each participant's salary; a second contribution, called interest credit, is made as well.  These are not actual contributions and further discussion is beyond the scope of this entry suffice it to say that there is currently much controversy.
In general, they are usually treated as defined benefit plans for tax, accounting and regulatory purposes. As with defined benefit plans, investment risk in hybrid designs is largely borne by the plan sponsor. As with defined contribution designs, plan benefits are expressed in the terms of a notional account balance, and are usually paid as cash balances upon termination of employment. These features make them more portable than traditional defined benefit plans and perhaps more attractive to a more highly mobile workforce.

Target benefit plans are defined contribution plans made to match (or resemble) defined benefit plans.

Contrasting types of retirement plans
Advocates of defined contribution plans point out that each employee has the ability to tailor the investment portfolio to his or her individual needs and financial situation, including the choice of how much to contribute, if anything at all. However, others state that these apparent advantages could also hinder some workers who might not possess the financial savvy to choose the correct investment vehicles or have the discipline to voluntarily contribute money to retirement accounts. This debate parallels the discussion currently going on in the U.S., where many Republican leaders favor transforming the Social Security system, at least in part, to a self-directed investment plan.

Financing

Defined contribution pensions, by definition, are funded, as the "guarantee" made to employees is that specified (defined) contributions will be made during an individual's working life.

There are many ways to finance a pension and save for retirement. Pension plans can be set up by an employer, matching a monetary contribution each month, by the state or personally through a pension scheme with a financial institution, such as a bank or brokerage firm. Pension plans often come with a tax break depending on the country and plan type.

For example, Canadians have the option to open a registered retirement savings plan (RRSP), as well as a range of employee and state pension programs. This plan allows contributions to this account to be marked as un-taxable income and remain un-taxed until withdrawal. Most countries' governments will provide advice on pension schemes.

 Financing structure 
Social and state pensions depend largely upon legislation for their sustainability.  Some have identified funds, but these hold essentially government bonds—a form of "IOU" by the state which may rank no higher than the state's promise to pay future pensions.

Occupational pensions are typically provided through employment agreements between workers and employers, and their financing structure must meet legislative requirements. In common-law jurisdictions, the law requires that pensions be pre-funded in trusts, with a range of requirements to ensure the trustees act in the best interests of the beneficiaries. These jurisdictions account for over 80% of assets held by private pension plans around the world.  Of the $50.7 trillion of global assets in 2019, $32.2T were in U.S. plans, the next largest being the U.K. ($3.2T), Canada ($2.8T), Australia ($1.9T), Singapore ($0.3T), Hong Kong and Ireland (each roughly $0.2T), New Zealand, India, Kenya, Nigeria, Jamaica, etc.

Civil-law jurisdictions with statutory trust vehicles for pensions include the Netherlands ($1.8T), Japan ($1.7T), Switzerland ($1.1T), Denmark ($0.8T), Sweden, Brazil and S. Korea (each $0.5T), Germany, France, Israel, P.R. China, Mexico, Italy, Chile, Belgium, Spain and Finland (each roughly $0.2T), etc. Without the vast body of common law to draw upon, statutory trusts tend to be more uniform and tightly regulated.

However, pension assets alone are not a useful guide to the total distribution of occupational pensions around the world. It will be noted that four of the largest economies (Germany, France, Italy and Spain) have very little in the way of pension assets. Nevertheless, in terms of typical net income replacement in retirement, these countries rank well relative to those with pension assets.  These and other countries represent a fundamentally different approach to pension provision, often referred to as "intergenerational solidarity".

Intergenerational solidarity operates to an extent in any country with a defined-benefit social security system, but is more controversial when applied to high levels of professional income. Why should younger generations pay for executive pensions which they themselves are unsure of collecting?  Employers have sought ways of getting round this problem through pre-funding, but in civil-law countries have often been limited by the legal vehicles available. A suitable legal vehicle should ideally have three qualities:

 It should convince employees that the assets are truly secured for their benefit;
 Contributions to the vehicle should be tax-deductible to the employer (or at least, a tax deduction should be secured already), and
 To the extent that it has funded the pension liability, the employer may reduce the liability shown on its balance sheet.

In the absence of appropriate statute, attempts have been made to invent suitable vehicles with varying degrees of success. The most notable has been in Germany where, until the end of the 20th century, most occupational pensions were unfunded ("book-reserved") promises by employers. Changes started in 1983 and by 1993 the preamble to proposed regulations under Section 404A of the U.S. Internal Revenue Code stated (when discussing deductible contributions to the German equivalent of a trust):...the Security Contract combines a book reserve commitment by an employer with a pledge and guaranty. First, an employer establishes a book reserve for its pension liabilities for which it receives a deduction under German law. It then establishes a wholly-owned subsidiary to which it transfers assets to fund its pension liabilities... [T]he subsidiary pledges its assets irrevocably to a custodian who then gives a guaranty to the employees to pay the benefits up to the assets pledged to the custodian in the event an employer declares bankruptcy or goes into receivership. The custodian's guaranty is intended to place a prior lien on the assets pledged and protect them from the claims of the employer's creditors in the event of bankruptcy or receivership.In December 2000, a magazine article described:...an artificial legal construction which, via a series of legal pledges between the employer, the employee and a separate custodian of the created pension fund, makes it possible to overcome the limitations of German law and establish what is effectively an Anglo Saxon-style trust.  This is a model which has created a great deal of interest in Germany, and several big name employers have already adopted a similar approach to enable unrestricted funding of their occupational pension schemes. Examples include Shell, Daimler-Chrysler and Hewlett Packard.As of August 2021, a major accounting firm describes what it calls the "market standard":...the standard instrument for the (out-) financing of pension commitments... From the employer's point of view, this primarily serves the purpose of taking pension provisions off the balance sheet but also the purpose of ensuring insolvency protection under private law of those pension claims that are not covered by the statutory insolvency protection.... In practice, so-called double-sided CTAs have become market standard, at the latest since the judgement of the German Federal Labour Court (Bundesarbeitsgericht, BAG) of 18 July 2013 (6 AZR 47/12). In this ruling, the BAG assumed the resistance to insolvency of a double-sided CTA when it comes to the insolvency protection of credit balances of employees from part-time employment relationships with older employees. The double-sided CTA comprises the trustee's administrative trust relationship with the employer for the administration of the trust assets as well as the security trust relationship between the trustee and the pension beneficiary, which is aimed at fulfilling the company pension commitment in the defined security cases.  The outsourcing of pension provisions for accounting purposes requires that the trust assets which the trustor contributes to the CTA—depending on the applicability of German GAAP/HGB or IFRS accounting approach—meet the balance sheet requirements as netting cover assets (section 246 (2) sentence 2 HGB) or as netting plan assets (IAS 19.8)... The... trust assets contributed to the CTA by the trustor may only be used to meet the claims of the beneficiaries.It therefore seems fair to say that first tax deductions, then favorable accounting treatment, spurred innovation in pension-financing structure which secured beneficiaries' rights, quite independently of government initiative.  Similar developments have occurred elsewhere, but the large scale of the German pension assets involved (not officially measured but at least in the several tens of billion dollars) make its story unique.

History

In the classical world, Romans offered veteran legionnaires (centurions) military pensions, typically in the form of a land grant or a special, often semi-public, appointment. Augustus Caesar (63 BC–AD 14) introduced one of the first recognisable pension schemes in history with his military treasury. In 13 BC Augustus created a pension plan in which retired soldiers were to receive a pension (of minimum 3,000 denarii in a lump sum, which at the time represented around 13 times a legionnaires' annual salary) after 16 years of service in a legion and four years in the military reserves. The retiring soldiers were in the beginning paid from general revenues and later from a special fund (aeririum militare) established by Augustus in 5 or 6 AD. This was in an attempt to quell a rebellion within the Roman Empire which was facing militaristic turmoil at the time. 

Widows' funds were among the first pension type arrangement to appear. For example, Duke Ernest the Pious of Gotha in Germany founded a widows' fund for clergy in 1645 and another for teachers in 1662.  "Various schemes of provision for ministers' widows were then established throughout Europe at about the start of the eighteenth century, some based on a single premium others based on yearly premiums to be distributed as benefits in the same year."

Modern forms of pension systems were first introduced in the late 19th century. Germany was the first country to introduce a universal pension program for employees.

 Germany 

As part of Otto von Bismarck's social legislation, the Old Age and Disability Insurance Bill was enacted and implemented in 1889. The Old Age Pension program, financed by a tax on workers, was originally designed to provide a pension annuity for workers who reached the age of 70 years, though this was lowered to 65 years in 1916. Unlike accident insurance and health insurance, this program covered industrial, agrarian, artisans and servants from the start and was supervised directly by the state.

Germany's mandatory state pension provisions are based on the pay-as-you-go (or redistributive) model. Funds paid in by contributors (employees and employers) are not saved and neither invested but are used to pay current pension obligations.

Recently, the German government has come under criticism for the impending disaster posed by the exorbitant tax burden resulting from civil servants' pensions. A study, commissioned by the Taxpayers Association, that Professor Bernd Raffelhüschen of the Generation Contracts Research Center of the University of Freiburg carried out states that by 2050, the state will have to spend 1.3 to 1.4 trillion EUR to supply its civil servants. The majority of it, about 870 billion EUR, is therefore spent on pensions.

The federal government's financial statements for 2016 already show the extent of that disaster. According to this, the expected costs for pensions and subsidies for medical treatment  for the number of federal civil servants at the end of 2016 will amount to 647 billion EUR over the course of the next ten years. That is 63 billion EUR more than in the previous year—an increase of ten percent in just one year.

The sum is divided into:

 Pension obligations of EUR 477.96 billion (plus 9.7 percent) and
 Aid obligations of EUR 169.02 billion (plus 13.4 percent).

Officials, judges and soldiers account for 238.4 billion EUR of the expected pension expenditure of almost 478 billion EUR. In addition, there are legacy issues from the times of large state-owned companies: the federal government has to pay out 171 billion EUR for old-age pensions for former postal officials and 68.5 billion EUR for former railway officials.

The problem: while the government preaches private pension provision to workers, the state itself has failed to build adequate reserves for the wave of pensions in the coming years. The federal government has been trying to create a cushion since 2007. So far, however, this has amounted to only 14 billion EUR by 2018. Professor Bernd Raffelhüschen criticised that the state had made high pension commitments for decades, "but initially didn't build up any reserves for a long time."

Pensions, thus, represent a considerable burden for public budgets. As Professor Bernd Raffelhüschen calculated in his study in 2005, the present value of the pension burden for the federal states amounts to 1,797 billion EUR, which is larger than the Germany's total public debt.

In various federal states, efforts are being made to secure pension expenditure by setting up pension funds for newly hired civil servants. Fiscal relief is, however, to be expected only when the newly hired officials retire. The share of tax revenue needed to supply for the pensions will increase from approximately 10% in 2001 in many federal states to over 20% in 2020. In the extreme case of the city-state of Hamburg, every fourth euro of income will be used to finance pensions for their retired civil servants.

Ireland

There is a history of pensions in Ireland that can be traced back to Brehon Law imposing a legal responsibility on the kin group to take care of its members who were aged, blind, deaf, sick or insane. For a discussion on pension funds and early Irish law, see F Kelly, A Guide to Early Irish Law (Dublin, Dublin Institute for Advanced Studies, 1988). In 2010, there were over 76,291 pension schemes operating in Ireland.

In January 2018, a "total contributions approach" qualification system was announced, effective from March 2018, for those pensioners who reached state pension age after 1 September 2012. The new system requires a person to have 40 years' worth or contributions to receive the full rate and a minimum total period of paid contributions of 520 weeks with ten years' full coverage. The State Pension is payable from age 66 with the age being increased to 67 in 2021 and 68 in 2028.

United Kingdom

The decline of Feudal systems and formation of national states throughout Europe led to the reemergence of standing armies with their allegiances to states. Consequently, the sixteenth century in England marked the establishment of standardised systems of military pensions. During its 1592–93 session, Parliament established disability payments or "reliefe for Souldiours ... [who] adventured their lives and lost their limbs or disabled their bodies" in the service of the Crown. This pension was again generous by contemporary standards, even though annual pensions were not to exceed ten pounds for "private soldiers", or twenty pounds for a "lieutenant".
 
The beginning of the modern state pension came with the Old Age Pensions Act 1908, that provided 5 shillings (£0.25) a week for those over 70 whose annual means do not exceed £31.50. It coincided with the Royal Commission on the Poor Laws and Relief of Distress 1905-09 and was the first step in the Liberal welfare reforms to the completion of a system of social security, with unemployment and health insurance through the National Insurance Act 1911.

In 1921, The Finance Act introduced tax relief on pension contributions in line with savings and life insurance. As a consequence, the overall size of the fund was increased since the income tax was now added to the pension as well.

Then in 1978, The State Earnings-Related Pension Scheme (SERPS) replaced The Graduated Pension Scheme from 1959, providing a pension related to earnings, in addition to the basic state pension. Employees and employers had the possibility to contribute to it between 6 April 1978 and 5 April 2002, when it was replaced by the State Second Pension.

After the Second World War, the National Insurance Act 1946 completed universal coverage of social security, introducing a State Pension for everybody on a contributory basis, with men being eligible at 65 and women at 60. The National Assistance Act 1948 formally abolished the poor law, and gave a minimum income to those not paying National Insurance.

The early-1990s established the existing framework for state pensions in the Social Security Contributions and Benefits Act 1992 and Superannuation and other Funds (Validation) Act 1992. Following the highly respected Goode Report, occupational pensions were covered by comprehensive statutes in the Pension Schemes Act 1993 and the Pensions Act 1995.

In 2002, the Pensions Commission was established as a cross-party body to review pensions in the United Kingdom. The first Act to follow was the Pensions Act 2004 that updated regulation by replacing OPRA with the Pensions Regulator and relaxing the stringency of minimum funding requirements for pensions while ensuring protection for insolvent businesses. In a major update of the state pension, the Pensions Act 2007, which aligned and raised retirement ages. Following that, the Pensions Act 2008 has set up automatic enrolment for occupational pensions, and a public competitor designed to be a low-cost and efficient fund manager, called the National Employment Savings Trust (or "Nest").

United States

First "American" pensions came in 1636, when Plymouth colony, and subsequently, other colonies such as Virginia, Maryland (1670s) and NY (1690s), offered the first colonial pension. The general assembly of the Virginia Company followed by approving a resolution known as Virginia Act IX of 1644 stating that "...all hurt or maymed men be relieved and provided for by the several counties, where such men reside or inhabit." Furthermore, during King Philip's War, otherwise known as the First Indian War, this Act was expanded to widows and orphans in Virginia's Act of 1675.

Public pensions got their start with various 'promises', informal and legislated, made to veterans of the Revolutionary War and, more extensively, the Civil War.  They were expanded greatly, and began to be offered by a number of state and local governments during the early Progressive Era in the late nineteenth century.Costa, D. L. (1995). Pensions and retirement: Evidence from union army veterans. The Quarterly Journal of Economics, 110(2), 297-319.

Federal civilian pensions were offered under the Civil Service Retirement System (CSRS), formed in 1920.  CSRS provided retirement, disability and survivor benefits for most civilian employees in the US Federal government, until the creation of a new Federal agency, the Federal Employees Retirement System (FERS), in 1987.

Pension plans became popular in the United States during World War II, when wage freezes prohibited outright increases in workers' pay. The defined benefit plan had been the most popular and common type of retirement plan in the United States through the 1980s; since that time, defined contribution plans have become the more common type of retirement plan in the United States and many other western countries.

In April 2012, the Northern Mariana Islands Retirement Fund filed for Chapter 11 bankruptcy protection.  The retirement fund is a defined benefit type pension plan and was only partially funded by the government, with only $268.4 million in assets and $911 million in liabilities.  The plan experienced low investment returns and a benefit structure that had been increased without raises in funding.
According to Pensions and Investments, this is "apparently the first" US public pension plan to declare bankruptcy.

Current challenges

A growing challenge for many nations is population ageing.  As birth rates drop and life expectancy increases an ever-larger portion of the population is elderly. This leaves fewer workers for each retired person.  In many developed countries this means that government and public sector pensions could potentially be a drag on their economies unless pension systems are reformed or taxes are increased.  One method of reforming the pension system is to increase the retirement age.  Two exceptions are Australia and Canada, where the pension system is forecast to be solvent for the foreseeable future.   In Canada, for instance, the annual payments were increased by some 70% in 1998 to achieve this.  These two nations also have an advantage from their relative openness to immigration: immigrants tend to be of working age. However, their populations are not growing as fast as the U.S., which supplements a high immigration rate with one of the highest birthrates among Western countries. Thus, the population in the U.S. is not ageing to the extent as those in Europe, Australia, or Canada.

Another growing challenge is the recent trend of states and businesses in the United States purposely under-funding their pension schemes in order to push the costs onto the federal government. For example, in 2009, the majority of states have unfunded pension liabilities exceeding all reported state debt. Bradley Belt, former executive director of the PBGC (the Pension Benefit Guaranty Corporation, the federal agency that insures private-sector defined-benefit pension plans in the event of bankruptcy), testified before a Congressional hearing in October 2004, "I am particularly concerned with the temptation, and indeed, growing tendency, to use the pension insurance fund as a means to obtain an interest-free and risk-free loan to enable companies to restructure. Unfortunately, the current calculation appears to be that shifting pension liabilities onto other premium payers or potentially taxpayers is the path of least resistance rather than a last resort."

Challenges have further been increased by the post-2007 credit crunch. Total funding of the nation's 100 largest corporate pension plans fell by $303bn in 2008, going from a $86bn surplus at the end of 2007 to a $217bn deficit at the end of 2008.

Pillars
Most national pension systems are based on multi-pillar schemes to ensure greater flexibility and financial security to the old in contrast to reliance on one single system. In general, there are three main functions of pension systems: saving, redistribution and insurance functions. 
According to the report by the World Bank titled "Averting the Old Age Crisis", countries should consider separating the saving and redistributive functions, when creating pension systems, and placing them under different financing and managerial arrangements into three main pillars.

The Pillars of Old Age Income Security:

However, this typology is rather a prescriptive than a descriptive one and most specialists usually allocate all public programmes to the first pillar, including earnings-related public schemes, which does not fit the original definition of the first pillar.

Zero pillar
This non-contributory pillar was introduced only recently, aiming to alleviate poverty among the elderly, and permitting fiscal conditions. It is usually financed by the state and is in form of basic pension schemes or social assistance.Holzmann, R., Hinz, R., von Gersdorff, H., Gill, I., Impavido, G., Musalem, A. R., … Subbarao, K. (2005). Old-Age Income Support in the 21st Century: An International Perspective on Pension Systems and Reform (pp. 10–10). N.W. Washington, D.C. 20433,USA: The International Bank for Reconstruction and Development / THE WORLD BANK. Retrieved from http://siteresources.worldbank.org/INTPENSIONS/Resources/Old_Age_Inc_Supp_Full_En.pdf In some typologies, the zero and the first pillar overlap.

First pillar
Pillar 1, sometimes referred to as the public pillar or first-tier, answers the aim to prevent the poverty of the elderly, provide some absolute, minimum income based on solidarity and replace some portion of lifetime pre-retirement income. It is financed on a redistributive principle without constructing large reserves and takes the form of mandatory contributions linked to earnings such as minimum pensions within earnings-related plans, or separate targeted programs for retirement income. These are provided by the public sector and typically financed on pay-as-you-go basis.

Second pillar
Pillar 2, or the second tier, built on the basis of defined benefit and defined contribution plans with independent investment management, aims to protect the elderly from relative poverty and provides benefits supplementary to the income from the first pillar to contributors. Therefore, the second pillar fulfils the insurance function. In addition to DB's and DC's, other types of pension schemes of the second pillar are the contingent accounts, known also as Notional Defined Contributions (implemented for example in Italy, Latvia, Poland and Sweden) or occupational pension schemes (applied, for instance, in Estonia, Germany and Norway).

Third pillar
The third tier consists of voluntary contributions in various different forms, including occupational or private saving plans, and products for individuals.

Fourth Pillar
The fourth pillar is usually excluded from classifications since it does not usually have a legal basis and consists of "informal support (such as family), other formal social programs (such as health care or housing), and other individual assets (such as home ownership and reverse mortgages)."

These five pillars and their main criteria are summarised in the table below by Holzmann and Hinz.

Multipillar Pension Taxonomy: 

 Different channels for Governments to finance the retirement pension 
Government can play with four different channels to finance the retirement pension. These economic policies are the following ones:

 Decrease of real pensions, 
 Increase of employee social contribution, 
 Increase of employer social contribution, 
 Increase of the retirement age.

These channels have been used by many governments to implement new retirement pension reforms. In the past, they had been sometimes simultaneously used (two or three channels used in the same time for a pension reform) or with a targeted way (on a certain group of persons such as in a certain business sector).

Retirement pensions turn out to be considerable amounts of money. For instance, in France, it is about 300 billion euros each year, namely 14-15% of French GDP. It is therefore very interesting and informative to illustrate the impacts of these different channels to finance the retirement pension, especially nowadays since many riots take place in different countries against new retirement pension reforms or willing to change the national retirement pension process.

Simulating these economic policies is then useful to understand every mechanism linked to these channels. Four different channels to finance retirement pensions will be simulated successively and will allow to explain their impacts on main economic variables presented below with an eight-year horizon. Some software of macroeconomic simulation allows to compute and display them. The implementation of these economic shocks and their mechanisms will be analysed in the following sections.

The economic variables of interest are various but the main ones can be chosen as follows: GDP level (impact in %), total employment level (impact in %), price index (impact in %), price growth rate (impact in points), current account (impact in GDP points), public finance balance (impact in GDP points) An objective relation may also be used. This one is a linear combination of the previous variables. This one is weighted according to the prominence given to some variables. For instance, if the government mainly focuses on GDP level and public finance balance, their assigned coefficient can be chosen as 0.3 each (the sum of the coefficients must be equal to 1). Other more specific variables could be used such as: household expenses level, corporate investments level, domestic demand level, purchasing power level and the like.

As a consequence, simulations are very relevant for everyone to understand the impacts of these channels to finance the retirement pension. However, simulations could be used in a reverse manner. Given the objective of government to get an economic variable improvement by a certain number, the four channels can be adjusted in order to achieve this goal. For example, a government may have an objective to get a public finance improvement by 2/3 GDP point the year 8.

In order to lead these simulations, the choice of hypotheses assumed is crucial. Concerning exchange rates, one can use the Purchasing Power Parity (PPP) measurement which happens to be an absolute purchasing power comparison in the countries concerned. Regarding interest rates, one can choose the Taylor Rule with a risk premium coefficient of -0.1. External trade price elasticities can also be assumedtobe -1. When it comes to Monetary Union, it depends on which country the study and thus the simulations are led. A Monetary Union can be concerned with any country. However, in order to get consistent results, a country such as Germany, France or Italy could be analysed. In this case, the monetary union is established with other European countries members of the euro area. Finally, every economic policy is led in the country concerned only.

 Decrease of real pensions 
This economic shock is to permanently decrease the amount of real pensions paid to retirees by for example 1 GDP point. Transfers from public power to households are therefore dropped by 1 GDP point. In the case of France (given 14–15% of GDP corresponds to retirement pensions), this is a drop of 7.5% of mass pension benefits.

It proves to be demand shock insofar as the household's available income decreases in the short term. This drop of purchasing power implies a diminishment of consumption and of demand in general. The activity is then negatively affected. However, the current account is improved as imports decrease following the reduce of domestic demand. In the medium term, since this cut of consumption and demand, unemployment increases. The price index decreases as the consumption price drops. As a consequence, exports increase. The real labour cost falls increasing thus companies' margins which limits the degradation of investments. The drop of consumption remains higher than the increase of current account which thereby results in the decrease of GDP. The public finance balance increases following the diminishment of pension benefits spent to retirees. However, unemployment benefits increase and given the drop of consumption and of household's incomes, which implies a fall in the incomes received from income tax and VAT by public administration.

 Increase of employee social contribution 
This economic shock involves the permanent increase of employee social contribution by for instance 2 points. This social contribution is spent by household as a share of mass wages received by them.

It turns out to be a demand shock because household's disposable income decreases from the short term. Indeed, the income perceived by employees is reduced following the increase of employee social contribution. As the previous channel, the drop of purchasing power result in a diminishment of consumption and demand in general. It implies a drop in activity. However, the current account is improved as imports are reduced following the cut of interior demand. In the medium term, the implications are similar to the decrease of real pensions. Employment and the price index decrease. Exports increase and the drop of investments is limited. The GDP decreases too. Finally, in the short term, the public finance balance increases but is quickly limited (but remains an increase) with the decrease of revenues from VAT and income taxes and the increase of unemployment.

 Increase of employer social contribution 
This economic shock is to permanently increase employer social contribution by for instance 2 points. This social contribution is spent by employer as a share of mass wages paid to each employee.

It proves to be a supply economic shock. Indeed, the rise of the labour cost degrades the labour demand and increases the costs of production. The competitivity is degraded and results in the drop of the purchasing power. Job losses are then attended: the unemployment strongly increases. This shock is also inflationary given that household's consumption prices rise. As corporations' profitability drops, exports and companies' investment fall too. The current account drops and this shock is not expansionist: the GDP decreases. Finally, the public finance balance is improved but less than planned. Indeed, employer social contribution is increased but it happens to be less than expected as unemployment rises. In addition, income tax is lower than before the shock, employee social contribution increases and unemployment benefits expenses increase.

 Increase of the retirement age 
This economic shock involves an increase of the retirement age. To do so, it implies a permanent increase in the working age of for instance 2% and to decrease the number of retirees of an equivalent amount. For this last step, it is tantamount to decrease global real pensions by a certain number of GDP point. In order to find this precise number for the simulation, we can assume people live on average 80 years, study during 20 years and are retirees during 20 years. As a consequence, an increase of 2% for life expectancy at work amounts to a decrease of 4% for life expectancy in retirement. Real pensions make globally a certain percentage of the GDP according to the country chosen. By knowing it, you can finally find the certain number of GDP point to simulate the decrease of number of retirees. For instance, in France real pensions make globally around 15% of GDP. Finally, -4% of 15% makes a decrease of 0.6 of GDP point.

In the short term, this labour force shock (supply policy) leads to an increase of unemployment which negatively affects household's purchasing power. The consumption decreases along with demand in general which leads to a decrease of activity. However, the current account is improved as imports are reduced with the drop of domestic demand. In the medium term, through the rise of unemployment, gross salary and the real labour cost progressively decreases. It results in the progressive increase of employment and thus the gradual decrease of unemployment. The household's consumption prices decrease: this shock is deflationary. The competitivity is improved which lead to a job creation and the boost of economic activity. The GDP increases and this shock is therefore expansionist. Administration's financing capacity improved in the short term happens to be limited in the medium term. Indeed, the drop of prices decreases the tax bases, especially household income.

 Pension systems by country 

Notable examples of pension systems by country
Some of the listed systems might also be considered social insurance.
 Argentina - Administración Nacional de la Seguridad Social
 Armenia - Pensions in Armenia
 Australia:
 Superannuation in Australia - Private, and compulsory, individual retirement contribution system.
 Social Security - Public pensions
Austria - Pensions in Austria
 Canada:
 Canada Pension Plan
 Old Age Security
 Quebec Pension Plan
 Registered retirement savings plan
 Saskatchewan Pension Plan
 Finland - Kansaneläkelaitos
 France:
 Pensions in France
 Allocation de Solidarité aux Personnes Agées
 Pensions Reserve Fund (France)
 Hong Kong:
 Mandatory Provident Fund (MPF Schemes)
 Occupational Retirement Schemes (ORSO Schemes)
 India:
 Pensions in India
 National Pension System
 Employees' Provident Fund Organisation of India
 Japan - National Pension
 Malaysia - Employees Provident Fund
 Mexico - Mexico Pension Plan
 Netherlands - Algemene Ouderdomswet
 New Zealand:
 New Zealand Superannuation – public pensions
 KiwiSaver – Private voluntary retirement contribution system
 Poland - Social Insurance Institution
 Singapore - Central Provident Fund
 South Korea - National Pension Service
 Sweden - Social security in Sweden
 Switzerland - Pension system in Switzerland
 United Kingdom:
 Pensions in the United Kingdom
 Self-invested personal pensions
 United States:
 Public employee pensions
 Retirement plans in the United States
 Social Security
 Vanuatu - Vanuatu National Provident Fund

See also
 Elderly care
 Financial advisor and Fee-only financial advisor
 Generational accounting
 Pension led funding
 Pension model
 Pensions crisis
 Public debt
 Retirement
 Retirement age
 Retirement planning
 Social pension

Specific:
 Bankruptcy code
 Ham and Eggs Movement, California pension proposal of the 1930s-40s
 Individual Pension Plan (IPP)
 Pension Rights Center
 Provident Fund
 Roth 401(k)
 Universities Superannuation Scheme

References

Further reading
 
Grünewald A. 2021. "From Benefits and Beneficiaries: The Historical Origins of Old-Age Pensions From a Political Regime Perspective." Comparative Political Studies''.

External links

 US Retirement
 UK State pension
 

 
Personal finance